Paolo Enrico Tusi Contis (born March 14, 1984) is a Filipino actor, host, singer, and comedian of Italian descent. Contis debuted as a child actor in the ABS-CBN show Ang TV during the 1990s. A GMA Network artist for 17 years, he has won several acting awards.

Biography and career
Contis was born to an Italian father and a Filipino mother. He was a popular child actor who appeared in various movies during the mid-1990s. Despite being cast in the popular teleserye Mara Clara, Contis was better known for being part of the kids-oriented program Ang TV, and the primetime sitcom Oki Doki Doc.

In his teenage years, he was launched as a member of Star Circle (now Star Magic) Batch 3 in 1996. Contis also rose to fame for his appearance in the youth-oriented teen drama Tabing Ilog.

In 2004, Contis moved to GMA Network and ventured into more mature roles. He played supporting and comic roles in numerous GMA dramas and shows, and has also found his niche in portraying antagonist roles. In 2008, Contis was hailed as the Best Actor at the 24th PMPC Star Awards Best Actor award for Banal, a film directed by GMA reporter Cesar Apolinario, who won as Best Director in the Metro Manila Film Festival in that same year.

In August 2009, Contis played the role of Kobra, Valentina's father, in the fantasy series Darna. This was the second time that Contis has worked with actress Marian Rivera (the two previously worked together in Ang Babaeng Hinugot sa Aking Tadyang.) Contis and Rivera worked together for the third time in the TV sitcom Show Me Da Manny, co-starring with Benjie Paras, Lovi Poe, and Ogie Alcasid.

Contis also hosted the defunct comedy reality show Wipeout: Matira Ang Matibay, his ninth comedy show in his television career and his fourth GMA comedy program. He was also cast in the drama series Little Star, marking his return to dramatic roles. He also took guest-hosting in the game show Press It, Win It when original host Joey de Leon took a temporary leave of absence; De Leon later returned to host the show.

In 2010, Contis returned to doing reality shows through Puso ng Pasko: Artista Challenge, GMA's first Christmas reality show.

In 2011, Contis worked in two drama series Machete and Futbolilits. He also took hosting duties in the game show Manny Many Prizes (with boxing champion Manny Pacquiao) and the talent show I-Shine: Talent Camp TV (with co-host Mikee Cojuangco-Jaworski and child actress Jillian Ward.) In 2012, he starred in My Beloved and Aso ni San Roque. In 2013, Contis appeared in Love & Lies and the recent remake of Villa Quintana.

In 2020, his two movies Ang Pangarap kong Holdap and Through Night and Day earned spots in Netflix as most viewed films in the Philippines. The said movies had earlier been released in theaters in 2018 but did not do well at the box-office.

In 2021, Contis starred in the film A Faraway Land with Yen Santos.

Personal life
Contis is the father of three children. He has two daughters from his previous marriage to Lian Paz, a former member of the EB Babes. As well as another daughter from his relationship with LJ Reyes. On September 1, 2021, Contis confirmed that the couple were no longer together. He is currently in a relationship with A Faraway Land co-star Yen Santos.

Filmography

Television

Film

Awards and recognitions
Winner, Best Actor in a Mini Series for "Maalaala Mo Kaya" - PMPC Star Awards for Television (2000, 2002, 2005 & 2006)
Winner, 24th PMPC's Star Awards’ Movie Actor of the Year of 2008: "Banal" Comguild Productions
Winner, 26th Luna Awards Best Actor of 2008: Banal

External links

Sparkle profile
 gmanews.tv/video, Paolo Contis tightly guarding Isabel Oli - 21 January 2008

References

1984 births
Living people
Star Magic
Filipino male child actors
Filipino male television actors
ABS-CBN personalities
GMA Network personalities
Tagalog people
Italian male actors
Filipino people of Italian descent
Male actors from Manila
Filipino male comedians
Filipino male film actors
Filipino television variety show hosts